Gordon Lightfoot: If You Could Read My Mind is a Canadian documentary film, directed by Martha Kehoe and Joan Tosoni and released in 2019. A profile of influential Canadian singer-songwriter Gordon Lightfoot, the film incorporates both Lightfoot's own perspective on his career in music and the reflections of other celebrities who were inspired or influenced by him, including Randy Bachman, Anne Murray, Sarah McLachlan, Tom Cochrane, Burton Cummings, Sylvia Tyson, Lenny Waronker and Alec Baldwin.

The film premiered at the Hot Docs Canadian International Documentary Festival in 2019.

The film received a Canadian Screen Award nomination for Best Feature Length Documentary at the 8th Canadian Screen Awards in 2020.

References

External links 
 

2019 films
Canadian documentary films
Documentary films about singers
2010s English-language films
2010s Canadian films